This is a list of songs that have been released by the Wiggles. Spoken word tracks, alternate versions, tracks in multiple languages, and karaoke versions are not listed. In case where a song was recorded for more than one album, the first recording is noted.

A-C
 "ABC" – Apples & Bananas
 "Advance Australia Fair" – Anthem - Celebration of Australia
 "Agapame Tin Athena (We Love Athens)" – Sailing Around the World
 "Alouette / Mimi's Dance" – Taking Off!
 "The Alphabet Ballet" - Big Ballet Day!
 "And the World Is One on Christmas Morning" – Yule Be Wiggling
 "Angels We Have Heard on High" – Yule Be Wiggling
 "Another Cuppa" – It's a Wiggly Wiggly World
 "Anthony's Workshop" – Whoo Hoo! Wiggly Gremlins!
 "Archie's Theme" (instrumental) – The Wiggles
 "(Are You Ready?) Do The Bus Stop –  You Make Me Feel Like Dancing
 "Aspri Mera Key Ya Mas" (Greek Lullaby) – Go To Sleep Jeff
 "Australia Zoo" – Wiggly Safari
 "Away in a Manger" – Wiggly, Wiggly Christmas
 "Baby Beluga" – Wake Up Jeff! (AUS version)
 "Baby Keep Smiling" – Taking Off!
 "Balla Balla Bambina" – Toot, Toot!
 "Ballerina, Ballerina" – The Wiggles Movie Soundtrack
 "The Barrel Polka" – Sailing Around the World
 "Bathtime" – Toot Toot! (AUS version)
 "Beach, Beach, Sandy Beach" - Getting Strong
 "Beep Beep Buckle Up" – Taking Off!
 "Bert the Wombat" – Here Comes a Song
 "Big Red Boat" – Splish! Splash! Big Red Boat
 "Big Red Car" – Big Red Car
 "Big Strong John" - Super Wiggles
 "Bing Bang Bong (That's a Pirate Song)" – Wake up Jeff
 "Bit by Bit (We're Building a Set)" – Whoo Hoo! Wiggly Gremlins!
 "Blow Me Down" – It's a Wiggly Wiggly World
 "Blow Up Your Balloon (Huff & Huff & Puff)" – Racing to the Rainbow
 "Boating Song" – Wiggle House
 "Bok the Hand  Puppet" - Fruit Salad TV
 "Bok the Super Puppet" - Super Wiggles
 "Boom Boom" – The Wiggles Movie Soundtrack
 "Boom, Boom, Boom, You're a Superhero" - Super Wiggles
 "Bound for South Australia" – Here Comes a Song
 "Bow Wow Wow" – Top of the Tots
 "BRC is the Big Red Car" – Wiggle House
 "Bricklayers Song" – Top of the Tots
 "Brisbane" – Sailing Around the World
 "Brown Girl in the Ring" – Big Red Car
 "Bucket of Dew/Paddy Condon From Cobar" – Wake up Jeff
 "Bump-A-Deedle" – Racing to the Rainbow
 "Butterflies Flit" – Yummy Yummy
 "Calling All Cows" – Top of the Tots
 "Camera One" – Whoo Hoo! Wiggly Gremlins!
 "Can You Dig It?" – Top of the Tots
 "Can You (Point Your Fingers and Do the Twist?)" – Big Red Car
 "Captain Feathersword" – Stories and Songs: The Adventures of Captain Feathersword the Friendly Pirate
 "Captain Feathersword Fell Asleep on His Pirate Ship" (also "Quack Quack") – Toot, Toot!
 "Captain Feathersword's Christmas Dance" – Santa's Rockin'!
 "Captain's Magic Buttons" – Hoop Dee Doo: It's a Wiggly Party
 "The Captain's Wavy Walk" – Sailing Around the World
 "Caveland" – Hoop Dee Doo: It's a Wiggly Party
 "Central Park New York" – Top of the Tots
 "C'est Wags, C'est Bon" – Wiggle Bay
 "The Chase" (Instrumental) – Yummy Yummy (NA version)
 "Chew Chew Song" – Racing to the Rainbow
 "Choppy Corker" - Super Wiggles
 "Christmas Around the World" – Yule Be Wiggling
 "Christmas Barcarolle" (Let the World Rejoice) – Santa's Rockin!
 "Christmas Picnic" – Wiggly, Wiggly Christmas
 "Christmas Polka" – Yule Be Wiggling
 "Christmas Star" – Wiggly, Wiggly Christmas
 "Chu-Lu-Lu" – Wake Up Jeff! (AUS version)
 "Cielito Lindo" – Cold Spaghetti Western
 "Cluck, Cluck City" – Ukulele Baby
 "Cocky Want a Cracker" – Wiggly Safari
 "Come and Sail the Sea" – Here Comes a Song
 "Come on Down to Wiggle Town" - Wiggle Town!
 "Come on Everybody" (We'll Tap for You) – Yule Be Wiggling
 "Come on Let's Jump" – Yummy Yummy
 "Country Garden" (Instrumental) – You Make Me Feel Like Dancing
 "Cowboys and Cowgirls" – Top of the Tots
 "Crocodile Hunter" – Wiggly Safari
 "Crunchy Munchy Honey Cakes" – Yummy Yummy
 "Curoo Curoo (Carol of the Birds)" – Yule Be Wiggling

D-F
 "D.O.R.O.T.H.Y (My Favourite Dinosaur)" – Yummy Yummy
 "Dance a Cachuca" – Wiggle Bay
 "Dance, Dance!" - Dance, Dance!
 "Dance the Gloomies Away" – Wiggle Bay
 "Dance the Ooby-Doo" – Hoop Dee Doo: It's a Wiggly Party
 "Dance to Your Daddy" – Taking Off!
 "Dancing Flowers" – Whoo Hoo! Wiggly Gremlins
 "Dancing in the Sand" – Wiggle Bay
 "Dancing on the High Seas" – Taking Off!
 "Dancing Ride" – Here Comes a Song
 "Daniel and Molly" – Here Comes a Song
 "Day-O (The Banana Boat Song)" – You Make Me Feel Like Dancing
 "Day of Joy, Day of Peace" (Hamish's Lullaby) – Santa's Rockin!
 "Decorate the Tree" – Yule Be Wiggling
 "Di Dicki Do Dum" – Big Red Car
 "Ding Dong Merrily on High" – Wiggly, Wiggly Christmas
 "The Dingle Puck Goat" - Go Bananas
 "Dingo Tango" – Wiggly Safari
 "Do the Bus Stop" – You Make Me Feel Like Dancing
 "Do the Daddy Long Legs" – Racing to the Rainbow
 "Do the Flap" – Big Red Car
 "Do the Owl" – Wiggly Safari
 "Do the Propeller!" – Taking Off!
 "Do the Skeleton Scat" – Pumpkin Face
 "Do the Wiggle Groove" – Toot, Toot!
 "Dr. Knickerbocker" – You Make Me Feel Like Dancing
 "Doing a Dance" – Yule Be Wiggling
 "Doo, Doo-Doo, Doo!" – Ukulele Baby
 "Dorothy (Would You Like to Dance?)" – Wake up Jeff
 "Dorothy Queen of the Roses" – Wiggly Safari
 "Dorothy the Dinosaur" – The Wiggles
 "Dorothy the Dinosaur (Tell Me Who Is That Knocking?)" – Toot, Toot!
 "Dorothy's Birthday Party" – Here Comes a Song
 "Dorothy's Christmas Roses" – Santa's Rockin!
 "Dorothy's Dance Party" – Big Red Car
 "The Dreaming Song" – Here Comes a Song
 "Dressing Up" – Whoo Hoo! Wiggly Gremlins!
 "Dungley Wobble" – Here Comes a Song
 "Eagle Rock" – Wiggle Bay 
 "Elephant" (Triple J Like a Version) – ReWiggled
 "El Pato" – Cold Spaghetti Western
 "Elbow to Elbow" – Sailing Around the World
 "Emma (with the Bow in Her Hair)" – Taking Off!
 "Emma's Bow Minuet" – Wiggle House
 "Emma's Christmas Bow" – Go Santa Go
 "England Swings" – Let's Eat
 "Everybody Dance!" – Racing to the Rainbow
 "Everybody is Clever" – Wake Up Jeff! (AUS version)
 "Everybody's Here" – Taking Off!
 "Everybody I Have a Question" – Go Santa Go!
 "Everybody Loves a Little Puppy" – Ukulele Baby
 "Everybody Wiggle Along" – We're All Fruit Salad!: The Wiggles' Greatest Hits
 "The Fairy Dance" – You Make Me Feel Like Dancing
 "Fais Do Do" – Yummy Yummy
 "Family Song" – Here Comes a Song
 "Farewell to the Wiggly Trail" – Cold Spaghetti Western
 "Feeding Time" – Wiggly Safari
 "Feeling Chirpy" – Top of the Tots
 "Feeling Hungry" – Wiggle House
 "Feliz Navidad" – Wiggly, Wiggly Christmas
 "Fergus' Jig" (Instrumental) – Wiggle Bay
 "Fiesta Siesta" – Cold Spaghetti Western
 "Fire Engines" – Here Comes a Song
 "The First Noel" – Yule Be Wiggling
 "Five Little Ducks" – Wake Up Jeff
 "Five Little Joeys Jumping on the Bed" – Big Red Car
 "Fly Through the Air" – Here Comes a Song
 "Fly Through the Sky"- Top of the Tots
 "Follow the Bird"- Cold Spaghetti Western
 "Follow the Leader" – Getting Strong
 "Food Food Food (Oh How I Love My Food)" – Toot, Toot!
 "Foodman" – Cold Spaghetti Western
 "The Four Presents" – Big Red Car
 "A Friendly Little Spider" – Pumpkin Face
 "A Frog Went a Walking" - Wake Up Jeff!
 "A Froggy He Would a Wooing-Go" – The Wiggles
 "Fruit Salad" – Yummy Yummy
 "The Full Moon Melody" – Pumpkin Face
 "Fun on the Farm" – Hoop Dee Doo: It's a Wiggly Party
 "Furry Wolfman" – Pumpkin Face

G-I
 "Galloping Ballet" – Wiggle House
 "The Garbage Truck Song" - Super Wiggles
 "Georgia's Song" – Big Red Car
 "Get Ready to Wiggle" – The Wiggles
 "Getting Strong" – Getting Strong
 "Go Captain Feathersword, Ahoy!" – Toot, Toot!
 "Go Santa Go" – Wiggly, Wiggly Christmas
 "Go to Sleep Jeff" (Brahms' Lullaby) – Go To Sleep Jeff!
 "Going Home" – Wiggle Bay
 "Goldfish" – Sailing Around the World
 "Good Ship Fabulous Flea" – Ukulele Baby
 "Goodbye from the Wiggles" - Getting Strong
 "Goodbye from Wiggle Town" - Wiggle Town
 "Great Big Man in Red" – Santa's Rockin!
 "Guess What?" – Wake Up Jeff
 "Gulp Gulp" – Whoo Hoo! Wiggly Gremlins!
 "The Gypsy Rover" – Here Comes a Song
 "Haru Ga Kita" – It's a Wiggly Wiggly World
 "Hat on My Head" – Big Red Car
 "Hats" – Whoo Hoo! Wiggly Gremlins!
 "Have a Happy Birthday Captain" – Stories and Songs: The Adventures of Captain Feathersword the Friendly Pirate
 "Have a Very Merry Christmas" – Wiggly, Wiggly Christmas
 "Havenu Shalom Alechem" (Hebrew Song of Peace) – Wake up Jeff
 "Having Fun at the Beach" – Wake Up Jeff
 "Head, Shoulders, Knees and Toes" – Toot, Toot!
 "Hello Henry!" - The Wiggles Meet the Orchestra
 "Hello, We're the Wiggles" - Getting Strong
 "Henry Likes Water" - Rock & Roll Preschool
 "Henry the Champion Christmas Wrapper" – Santa's Rockin!
 "Henry the Octopus" – Here Comes a Song
 "Henry's Christmas Dance" – Wiggly, Wiggly Christmas
 "Henry's Dance" – Big Red Car
 "Henry's Underwater Big Band" – Wake up Jeff
 "Here Come Our Friends" - Surfer Jeff
 "Here Come the Chicken" (also "The Chicken Song") – Racing to the Rainbow
 "Here Come the Reindeer" – Yule Be Wiggling
 "Here Come the Wiggles" – It's a Wiggly Wiggly World
 "Here Comes a Bear" – Here Comes a Song
 "Here Comes a Camel" - Go Bananas!
 "Here Comes Santa Claus" – The Spirit of Christmas 1998
 "Here We Go Dorothy" – Big Red Car
 "Here We Go Mexico City!"  – Sailing Around the World
 "Hey, Billy Bat!" – Pumpkin Face
 "Hey Now, Let's Have a Party!" – Cold Spaghetti Western
 "Hey There Partner" – Top of the Tots
 "Hey There Wally" – The Wiggles Movie Soundtrack
 "Hey Tsehay!" - Super Wiggles
 "Hey Hey It's Saturday (Feat. Daly Somers)" – Ukulele Baby (AUS version)
 "Hey, Hey, Hey We're All Pirate Dancing" – It's a Wiggly Wiggly World
 "Hey, Wags!" - Wiggle House
 "Hoop-Dee-Doo" – Hoop Dee Doo: It's a Wiggly Party
 "Hot Poppin' Popcorn" – Hot Poppin' Popcorn
 "Hot Potato" – Yummy Yummy
 "House on the Hillside" – Wake up Jeff
 "Howling Wolf" – Pumpkin Face
 "Huddle Huddle Huddle Along" (The Football Song) – Racing to the Rainbow
 "Hula Hula Hula" (Nothing Could Be Cooler) – Sailing Around the World
 "Hula Hula Baby" – Ukulele Baby
 "Hula, Hula, Merry Christmas to Ya" - Go Santa Go
 "I'm a Cow" – Big Red Car
 "I’m Dorothy the Dinosaur!" - Hot Potatoes: The Best of the Wiggles
 "I'm John, I'm Strong!" - Fruit Salad TV
 "I Am a Dancer" – Big Red Car
 "I Can Do So Many Things" – Wake up Jeff
 "I Climb Ten Stairs" – Toot, Toot!
 "I Drive The Big Red Car" – You Make Me Feel Like Dancing
 "I've Got My Glasses On!" – Taking Off!
 "I Just Can't Sleep on Christmas Eve!" It's Always Christmas with You'''
 "I Like Scary Nights" – Pumpkin Face "I Look in the Mirror" – Here Comes a Song "I Love It When It Rains" – Here Comes a Song "I Love to Have a Dance with Dorothy" – It's a Wiggly Wiggly World "I Skate and Wear Yellow" - Fruit Salad TV "I Stamp" – Pumpkin Face "I Want to Wear the Jacket" – Here Comes The Big Red Car "I Wave My Arms and Swing My Baton" – Top of the Tots "Il Clan Dei Siciliani" - Ukulele Baby "I'll Tell Me Ma" – Apples and Bananas "In the Big Red Car We Like to Ride" – It's a Wiggly Wiggly World "In the Wiggles' World" – It's a Wiggly Wiggly World "Is There a Superhero Around?" - Super Wiggles "It's Always Christmas with You" - It's Always Christmas with You "It's a Christmas Party on the Good Ship Feathersword" – Wiggly, Wiggly Christmas "It's A Long Way From the North Pole" - It's Always Christmas with You If Your Happy and You Know It - The Wiggles
 "It's A Long Way to the Top (If You Wanna Rock & Roll)" - Andrew Denton's Musical Challenge "Itchy Fingers (Jimmy's Sea Shanty)" - DuetsJ-L
 "Jeff's Christmas Tune" – Wiggly, Wiggly Christmas "Jimmy the Elf" – Yule Be Wiggling "Jingle Bells" – Wiggly, Wiggly Christmas "Joannie Works with One Hammer" – Big Red Car – same as "Johnny Works with One Hammer"
 "John Bradlelum" – Toot, Toot! "John O'Dreams" – Go To Sleep, Jeff "Joannie Works with One Hammer" – The Wiggles 
 "Joseph John's Lullaby" – The Wiggles "Just Can't Wait for Christmas Day" – Yule Be Wiggling "Knead Some Dough" – Top of the Tots "Knock Knock, Who's There?" – Whoo Hoo! Wiggly Gremlins! "Koala La La" – Wiggly Safari "Kookaburra Choir" – Wiggly Safari "La Bamba" – You Make Me Feel Like Dancing "Lachy's Lullaby" – Big Ballet Day! "La Cucaracha" – Hoop Dee Doo: It's a Wiggly Party "La Paloma" – Ukulele Baby "Laughing Doctor" – Wiggle House "Lavender's Blue" – The Wiggles "Lechoo Yeladim" (Hebrew: Go children) – Here Comes a Song "Let's Clap Hands for Santa Claus" – Wiggly, Wiggly Christmas "Let's Go (We're Riding in the Big Red Car)" – It's a Wiggly Wiggly World "Let's Go Swimming" – Top of the Tots "Let's Go to the Great Western Café" – Cold Spaghetti Western "Let's Have a Barbie on the Beach" – Wiggle Bay "Let's Have a Ceili" (Instrumental) – Toot, Toot! "Let's Have a Party" – The Wiggles Movie Soundtrack "Let's Make Some Rosy Tea" – Wiggle Bay "Let's Spend a Day at the Beach" – Hoop Dee Doo: It's a Wiggly Party "Lettuce Sing" (Fresh Fruit and Veggies) – Top of the Tots "Lights, Camera, Action, Wiggles!" – Whoo Hoo! Wiggly Gremlins! "The Lion and the Unicorn" – Here Comes a Song "Listen to the Drummer Playing" – Cold Spaghetti Western "Little Brown Ant" – Here Comes a Song "Little Bunny Foo-Foo" – Taking Off! "Little Children" – Hoop Dee Doo: It's a Wiggly Party "The Little Drummer Boy" – Yule Be Wiggling "Little Sir Echo" - Wiggle House "Little Vampires" – Pumpkin Face "London Town" – Sailing Around the World "Look Both Ways" – Toot, Toot! "Love Train" – Racing to the Rainbow "Lullabies With Love" – Lullabies With Love "Lullaby Overture" – Go to Sleep JeffM-P
 "Magic Club Music" – The Wiggles Movie Soundtrack "Magic Kindy" – Here Comes a Song "Maranoa Lullaby" – The Wiggles "Marie's Wedding" – Hoop Dee Doo: It's a Wiggly Party "Mary's Boy Child" – Santa's Rockin'  "The Master Pasta Maker (From Italy)" – Cold Spaghetti Western 
 "Meteorology" (The Study of the Atmosphere) – Taking Off! "Mischief the Monkey" – The Wiggles "Mitten the Kitten" – Here Comes a Song "The Monkey, the Bird and the Bear" - Go Bananas "Monkey Dance" – Yummy Yummy "Monkey Man" (Feat. Kylie Minogue) – Go Bananas "Montezuma" (Instrumental) – The Wiggles "The Mooche" (Instrumental) – You Make Me Feel Like Dancing "Mop Mop" – Sailing Around the World "Morningtown Ride" – It's a Wiggly Wiggly World "Move Like an Emu" – Hoop Dee Doo: It's a Wiggly Party "Move Your Arms Like Henry" – Toot, Toot! "Mrs. Bingles Theme" – The Wiggles Movie Soundtrack "Mumbles the Monster" – Pumpkin Face "Murray Had a Turtle" – Pop Goes the Wiggles "Murray's Christmas Samba" – Yule Be Wiggling "Music Box Dancer" – Racing to the Rainbow "Music with Murray" – Whoo Hoo! Wiggly Gremlins! "My New Shoes" – Big Red Car "Name Game" – Wake up Jeff "New York Firefighter" – Top of the Tots "Nicky Nacky Nocky Noo" – Big Red Car "Numbers Rhumba" – Yummy Yummy "Nya Nya Nya" – The Wiggles Movie Soundtrack – tune is "I'll Tell Me Ma"
 "O Come All Ye Faithful" – Santa's Rockin'  "O Epoe Tooki Tooki" – The Wiggles "October Winds" – Go to Sleep, Jeff "Officer Beaples' Dance" (Instrumental) – Toot, Toot! "Okki Tokki Unga" – The Wiggles "Old Dan Tucker" – You Make Me Feel Like Dancing "Old Man Emu" – Wiggly Safari "Olive Oil" – Cold Spaghetti Western "Olive Oil Is My Secret Ingredient" – Surfer Jeff "On Your Holiday" – Big Red Car "One Finger, One Thumb" – You Make Me Feel Like Dancing "One Little Coyote" – It's a Wiggly Wiggly World "Ooey Ooey Ooey Allergies" – Surfer Jeff
 "Ooh It's Captain Feathersword" – The Wiggles Movie Soundtrack "Open Wide Look Inside At the Dentist" – Top of the Tots "Open, Shut Them" - Apples and Bananas
 "Our Boat Is Rocking on the Sea" – Stories and Songs: The Adventures of Captain Feathersword the Friendly Pirate "Paw, Paw Wags" - It's Always Christmas with You "Peanut Butter" – Taking Off! "The Pennsylvania Polka" – Sailing Around the World "Picking Flowers" – Top of the Tots "Pipers Waltz" – Wake up Jeff "Play Your Guitar with Murray" – Hoop Dee Doo: It's a Wiggly Party "Playhouse Disney Theme" (both generic and character versions) - Playhouse Disney 2
 "Poesje Mauw" – Here Comes a Song "Polly Put the Kettle On" – Racing to the Rainbow "Ponies" – Yummy Yummy "Porcupine Pie" – It's a Wiggly Wiggly World "The Princess of the Sea" – Racing to the Rainbow "Pufferbillies" – Big Red Car "Pumpkin Face" – Pumpkin FaceQ-S
 "Quack Quack" – see "Captain Feathersword Fell Asleep On His Pirate Ship"
 "Rainbow of Colours" – Racing to the Rainbow "Ready, Steady, Wiggle" – Taking Off! "Reindeer Express" – Wiggly, Wiggly Christmas "Ring-A-Ding-A-Ding Dong!" – Santa's Rockin'! "The Road to the Isles (Do the Highland Fling)" - Dance, Dance "Rock & Roll Preschool" - Rock & Roll Preschool "Rock-A-Bye Your Bear" – The Wiggles "Rocket" – Toot Toot! "Rockin' and a Rollin' Sea" – The Wiggles Movie Soundtrack "Rockin' on the Water" – Racing to the Rainbow "Rockin' Santa!" – Santa's Rockin'! "Roll the Acrobats" - Wiggle House "Rolling Down the Sandhills" – Wiggle Bay "Romp Bomp a Stomp" – Wake up Jeff "Row, Row, Row Your Boat" – Racing to the Rainbow "Rudolph the Red Nosed Reindeer" – Wiggly, Wiggly Christmas "Run Around Run Run" – Hoop Dee Doo It's a Wiggly Party "Sailing Around the World" – Sailing Around the World "A Sailor Went to Sea" – You Make Me Feel Like Dancing "San Francisco Trolley Car" – Sailing Around the World "Sanctissima" – Big Red Car "Say Aah At the Doctors" – Top of the Tots "Scary Ghost" – Pumpkin Face "A Scottish Christmas" (Instrumental) – Yule Be Wiggling "Shake Your Sillies Out" – Yummy Yummy "Shakin' Like a Leafy Tree" – Racing to the Rainbow "Shaky Shaky" – Yummy Yummy "The Shimmie Shake!" – You Make Me Feel Like Dancing "Sicily (I Want to Go)" – Sailing Around the World "Silent Night" – Wiggly, Wiggly Christmas "Silver Bells (That Ring in the Night)" – Toot Toot! (AUS version)
 "Simon Says" – Taking Off! "Simon's Cold Water Blues" – Taking Off! "Sing a Song of Polly" – Here Comes a Song "Sing with Me" – It's a Wiggly Wiggly World "Sleep Safe, My Baby – Let’s Eat! "Six Months in a Leaky Boat (Wiggly Version)" – It's a Wiggly Wiggly World "Snakes (You Can Look but You Better Not Touch)" – Wiggly Safari "Sorry Again" – Here Comes the Big Red Car "The Sound of Halloween" – Pumpkin Face "Spot the Dalmatian" – The Wiggles "Stamp Your Feet (To the Heavy Beat)" – Racing to the Rainbow "Star Lullaby" – The Wiggles "The Story of Thomas the Turkey" – You Make Me Feel Like Dancing "Suo Gan" – The Wiggles "Sur le Pont d'Avignon" - Apples and Bananas "Surfer Jeff" – Surfer Jeff "Swedish Rhapsody" – You Make Me Feel Like Dancing (album) "Swim Henry Swim" – Hoop Dee Doo It's a Wiggly Party "Swim Like a Fish" – Wiggle Bay "Swim with Me" – Wiggly Safari "Sydney Barcarolle" – Sailing Around the WorldT-V
 "Taba Naba" – It's a Wiggly Wiggly World "Take a Trip Out on the Sea" – Wake up Jeff "Tales of the Symphony Orchestra" - The Wiggles Meet The Orchestra "Tales of the Vienna Woods" (Instrumental) – You Make Me Feel Like Dancing "Tap Wags" – The Wiggles Movie Soundtrack "Teddy Bear Hug" – Big Red Car "Teddy Bear's Big Day Out" – Racing to the Rainbow Teddy Bear Teddy Bear Turn Around – Pop Go the Wiggles "Testing, One, Two, Three" – Whoo Hoo! Wiggly Gremlins! "Thank You, Mr. Weatherman" – Ukulele Baby  (NA version)
 "This Old Man" – The Wiggles "This Little Baby is Born Again" – Santa's Rockin'  "Three Animals" – Here Comes a Song "Three Little Pumpkins" – Pumpkin Face "Tick Tock (All Night Long)" – Top of the Tots "Tidy Up Song" – Here Comes a Song "Tie Me Kangaroo Down, Sport" – It's a Wiggly Wiggly World "The Toilet Song" - The Wiggles' Big Ballet Day! "Toot, Toot, Chugga, Chugga, Big Red Car" – Toot, Toot! "The Tra-La-La Song" – Racing to the Rainbow "Treasure Chest" – Stories and Songs: The Adventures of Captain Feathersword the Friendly Pirate "Trick or Treat" – Pumpkin Face "Turkey in the Straw" – You Make Me Feel Like Dancing "Twinkle Twinkle Little Star" – Pop Go the Wiggles "Two Little Dickie Birds" – You Make Me Feel Like Dancing "Uncle Noah's Ark" – Here Comes a Song "The Unicorn" - "Go Bananas!"
 "Unto Us, This Holy Night" – Wiggly, Wiggly Christmas "Vegetable Soup" – Whoo Hoo! Wiggly Gremlins! "Veil" (Instrumental) – Yummy Yummy "Vini Vini" – The WigglesW-Z
 "Wags Ate the Rags" – Wiggly, Wiggly Christmas "Wags Is Bouncing Around the Christmas Tree" – Wiggly, Wiggly Christmas "Wags Loves to Shake Shake" – Yule Be Wiggling "Wags Stop Your Barking, It's Almost Christmas Day!" – Santa's Rockin! "Wags the Dog" – Big Red Car "Wags the Dog, He Likes to Tango" – Toot, Toot! "Wah Hoo Hey, I'm Combing My Hair Today" – Toot, Toot! "Wake Up!" – Rock & Roll Preschool "Wake Up Jeff!" – Wake up Jeff "Wake Up Lachy!" – Furry Tales "Walk" – Yummy Yummy "Walk On The Wild Side" - Andrew Denton's Musical Challenge 2: Even More Challenged! "Walking on the Moon" – Top Of The Tots "Wally's Dream Music" – The Wiggles Movie Soundtrack "Watching the Waves" – Wiggle Bay "Wave to Wags" – Wake up Jeff "We're All Friends" – Here Comes a Song "We're All Fruit Salad" – We're All Fruit Salad!: The Wiggles' Greatest Hits "We're Dancing with Wags the Dog" – Toot, Toot! "We're Playing a Trick on the Captain" – Stories and Songs: The Adventures of Captain Feathersword the Friendly Pirate "We're the Cowboys" – Cold Spaghetti Western "We're the Crocodile Band" – Wiggly Safari "We Like to Say Hello" – Wake up Jeff "We Wish You a Merry Christmas" – Wiggly, Wiggly Christmas "Welcome to Network Wiggles!" – Whoo Hoo! Wiggly Gremlins "What's This Button For?" – Wiggle Bay "Wheels on the Bus" – Racing to the Rainbow "When I Hear the Music of the Orchestra" - The Wiggles Meet the Orchestra "When I Strum My Ukulele" – Ukulele Baby "Whenever I Hear This Music" – Here Comes a Song "Where's Jeff?" – Whoo Hoo! Wiggly Gremlins! "Where Is Thumbkin?" – Yummy Yummy "Who Got The Bones?" – Taking Off! "Who Killed Cock Robin?" – Pumpkin Face "Who's in The Wiggle House?" - Wiggle House "Wiggle Bay" – Wiggle Bay "Wiggle Hula" – Hoop Dee Doo: It's a Wiggly Party "Wigglemix" – The Wiggles Movie Soundtrack "Wiggletto" - Dance, Dance! "Wiggly Medley" – The Wiggles Movie Soundtrack Wiggly Christmas Medley – Live Hot Potatoes "The Wiggly Owl Medley" – Wiggly Safari "Wiggly Party" – Hoop Dee Doo: It's a Wiggly Party Wiggly Sports Theme (Instrumental) – Whoo Hoo! Wiggly Gremlins!, see also "Rolling Down the Sandhills"
 "The Wiggly Trail" – Cold Spaghetti Western "Wiggly, Wiggly Christmas" – Wiggly, Wiggly Christmas "Willaby Wallaby Woo" – Yummy Yummy "Witchy-Woo, Ooh, Ooh, Ooh!" – Pumpkin Face "Wind, Rain and the Sea" – Stories and Songs: The Adventures of Captain Feathersword the Friendly Pirate "Windmills" – Wake up Jeff "Wobbly Camel" – Wiggly Safari "The Wobbly Dance" – Hoop Dee Doo: It's a Wiggly Party "The Wonder of Wiggle Town" - Wiggle Town! "Would You Giggle?" – Yummy Yummy "Would You Like To Go To Scotland?" – Surfer Jeff
 "Yawn Yawn Yawn" – Yummy Yummy "You Make Me Feel Like Dancing" (Feat. Leo Sayer) – You Make Me Feel Like Dancing "You Might Like a Pet" – Wiggly Safari "Yule Be Wiggling" – Yule Be Wiggling "Zamel the Camel Has Five Humps" – Wiggle House "Zardo Zap" – Toot, Toot! "The Zeezap Song" – Wiggle Bay "Zing Zang Wing Wang Wong"- Wiggle Bay "Zombie Feet" – Pumpkin Face "Zoological Gardens" – Hoop Dee Doo: It's a Wiggly Party''

See also
 The Wiggles discography

Notes

External links
CD Discography and store at CDUniverse

Wiggles